Ladislao "Lalo" Encinas (June 27, 1886 – May 5, 1959) was an American character actor active in Hollywood from the 1910s through the 1950s.

He was noted as one of few Apache actors working in the motion picture industry by contemporaneous reporters, though according to census records, it appears he was of mestizo or indigenous Mexican ancestry.

Biography 
Encinas was born in Pima, Arizona. His parents were Jesus Encinas and Jacinta Bustamant, both from Mexico. Eventually he went to Hollywood and began working as an actor. He was noted for his tall stature, as he reportedly was six feet, four inches tall, and weighted 280 pounds. Encinas died in May 1959 in Los Angeles County, California, at the age of 72.

Filmography

References

External links 

American male film actors
Male actors from Arizona
1886 births
1959 deaths
20th-century American male actors